C. T. Wilson (born February 20, 1972) is an American politician and attorney who has represented District 28 in the Maryland House of Delegates since 2011.

Background
Wilson was born in Missouri. An orphan, he lived in several foster homes as a child. Wilson has stated he was sexually abused and repeatedly raped by his adoptive father while in foster care from the ages of 9 to 15.

He graduated from Freeburg Community High School in Freeburg, Illinois. After high school, at 18, he enlisted as a combat soldier in the U.S. Army from 1990 to 1997. He served in the Persian Gulf and Bosnia Herzegovina in both combat and medical units. Wilson later graduated cum laude from Upper Iowa University with a B.A. in psychology. He then went on to the Howard University School of Law where he earned a J.D. in 2003, and was admitted to Maryland Bar. After graduating, he helped organize the Community Prosecution Unit of the Prince George's County State's Attorney's Office.

He is a Maryland Foster Youth Resource Center boardmember and a National Eagle Scout Association member. He and his wife Nicole have three daughters.

In the legislature
Wilson has been a member of House of Delegates since January 12, 2011, and is the first Black man elected delegate in Charles County. and served as the chair on the Business Regulations Subcommittee under the Economic Matters Committee. He is a member of the Southern Maryland Delegation and the Legislative Black Caucus of Maryland. He previously served as the House Chair of the Maryland Veterans Caucus. In December 2021, House Speaker Adrienne A. Jones appointed Wilson chairman of the House Economic Matters Committee, succeeding Delegate Dereck E. Davis.

Political positions

Education
During the 2021 legislative session, Wilson introduced legislation to require the Maryland State Board of Education to create statewide standards for teaching Black history to public school students. The bill was reintroduced during the 2022 legislative session.

In 2022, Wilson opposed legislation to break up the College of Southern Maryland to create a new Charles County Community College.

Elections
In 2016, Wilson voted against overriding Governor Larry Hogan's veto on legislation that would restore voting rights to felons on parole and probation.

Justice
Wilson opposed legislation to repeal the death penalty in Maryland, saying, "I wish we did not need the death penalty... but I've seen the worst of the worst, and I know it's necessary." During the debate on the bill in 2013, Wilson opposed an amendment to keep execution as an option for those who kill after being sentenced to death or life in prison. The amendment failed by a 61-77 vote.

Paid family leave
Wilson introduced legislation in the 2022 legislative session to provide up to 12 weeks of paid family leave to all Maryland workers. During a hearing on the bill, he introduced an amendment to replace the bill with a commission to investigate how to implement a statewide paid family leave program. The bill was later restored and passed with an effective date of 2025 in a compromise with Wilson. The bill became law after the General Assembly voted to override Governor Larry Hogan's veto on April 9, 2022.

Policing
Following the 2015 Baltimore protests, Wilson called on finding a "middle ground" on police reform legislation. During the 2021 legislative session, Wilson introduced legislation requiring police officers to identify themselves and notify individuals of their right to refuse to speak or provide information during a traffic stop.

Social issues
Wilson opposed a bill introduced in the 2011 legislative session to legalize same-sex marriage in Maryland, saying "I'm taking the courageous stance. I have not had a chance to take this to my constitutes and get their opinion."

Wilson introduced legislation in the 2012 legislative session to make it a felony offense to transfer knowingly, or attempt to transfer, HIV to another person.

During the 2014 legislative session, Wilson introduced a resolution to urge the owners of the Washington Redskins to change the football team's name to something that "is not offensive to Native Americans or any other group".

Wilson introduced legislation in the 2015 legislative session to make March 30 "Welcome Home Vietnam Veterans Day". The bill passed and was signed into law by Governor Larry Hogan on March 30, 2015.

During the 2017 legislative session, Wilson introduced legislation extending the statute of limitations on child sexual abuse cases from 25 to 38. The bill was introduced in previous legislative sessions but was blocked by Catholic Church lobbyists and Delegate Joseph F. Vallario Jr., the chair of the House Judiciary Committee. The bill passed and was signed into law by Governor Larry Hogan on April 4, 2017. In 2019, he introduced a bill to abolish the statute of limitations on child sexual assault cases, which the Senate Judiciary Committee later voted down after passing the House of Delegates by a vote of 135–3. Later that day, the House Judiciary Committee agreed to include compromise provisions in legislation introduced by Senator Justin Ready, including one to increase the statute of limitations to the age of 58. He re-introduced, and later withdrew, this bill during the 2021 legislative session.

In 2021, he supported legislation that would lower the state's age of mental health consent to 12 years old.

Electoral history

References

External links
 

Democratic Party members of the Maryland House of Delegates
African-American state legislators in Maryland
People from St. Clair County, Missouri
United States Army soldiers
Upper Iowa University alumni
Howard University School of Law alumni
Maryland lawyers
21st-century American politicians
People from Charles County, Maryland
21st-century African-American politicians
20th-century African-American people
1972 births
Living people